The SABA Women's Championship is a basketball tournament for women's national teams organized by the South Asia Basketball Association, a sub-zone of the FIBA Asia. 

Following the disappointment of not able to play basketball at the 2016 South Asian Games, the newly created tournament marks the beginning of another step in basketball development for South Asia region.

Summary

Medal table

Participating nations

See also 
 SABA Championship
 SAFF Women's Championship
 South Asian Games

References

 
Women's basketball competitions in Asia between national teams
2016 establishments in Asia